Cutter & Malmgren was an architectural firm of Kirtland K. Cutter and Karl G. Malmgren in Spokane, Washington that existed from c.1889 to 1917.  The firm designed multiple buildings that are listed on the U.S. National Register of Historic Places.

The firm was founded in c.1889 by Cutter and John Poetz as Cutter & Poetz.  Upon Poetz's retirement it was reorganized as Cutter & Malmgren.  The partnership closed in 1917, after which Cutter continued in individual practice.

Work

Works of the partnership or Malmgren alone (with attribution specifics) include:
Daniel C. and Anna Corbin House, 507 W. Seventh Ave., Spokane (Cutter & Malmgren), NRHP-listed
Finch House, W. 2340 1st Ave., S. 104 Poplar, Spokane, built c. 1897.
Metaline Falls School, 302 Park, Metaline Falls, WA (Cutter & Malmgren), NRHP-listed
Rainier Club, 810 4th Ave., Seattle, WA (Cutter & Malmgren), NRHP-listed  Built 1903 in Tudor Revival, Jacobethan Revival style.
Sperry Chalets, E of West Glacier, West Glacier, Montana (Cutter & Malmgren), NRHP-listed
Spokane Sash and Door Company Flats, 1302-1312 W Broadway Ave., Spokane (Cutter & Malmgren), NRHP-listed
St. Andrews Episcopal Church, 120 E. Woodin Ave., Chelan, Washington (Malmgren, Karl G.), NRHP-listed
Dr. Charles and Elsie Thomas House, 1212 N. Summit Blvd., Spokane (Cutter & Malmgren), NRHP-listed
Ralston and Sarah Wilbur House, 2525 E. 19th Ave., Spokane (Cutter & Malmgren), NRHP-listed
One or more contributing elements in Nettleton's Addition Historic District, an area bounded by W. Summit, Mission, N Summit, A St. Bridge, and Chestnut, Spokane (Cutter & Malmgren), NRHP-listed
One or more contributing elements in Ninth Avenue Historic District, roughly bounded by 7th Ave., Monroe St., 12th Ave. and the Burlington Northern RR tracks, Spokane (Cutter and Malmgren), NRHP-listed
 Clubhouse, Seattle Golf Club, Shoreline, Washington

References

Architecture firms based in Washington (state)